Roger Wallis (8 August 1941 – 22 January 2022) was a British-born Swedish musician, journalist and researcher.

Life and career
Wallis was a resident of Sweden from 1963, and was an adjunct professor of multimedia at the Royal Institute of Technology in Stockholm.

Between 1967 and 1981, Wallis was the main presenter of the English language The Saturday Show on Radio Sweden. Wallis also co-wrote "Judy, min vän", the Swedish contribution for the Eurovision Song Contest 1969. 

He wrote several books on the music industry with Krister Malm. Wallis was appointed to the board of STIM. He testified in the Pirate Bay trial in February 2009. Wallis died on 22 January 2022, at the age of 80.

References 

1941 births
2022 deaths
Swedish composers
Swedish male composers
Academic staff of the KTH Royal Institute of Technology
British emigrants to Sweden
People from Rugby, Warwickshire